Roman Andreyevich Vlasov (born 6 October 1990) is a Russian Greco-Roman wrestler. He is a two-time Olympic Champion (2012, 2016), a three-time World Champion (2011, 2015, 2021), and a four-time European Champion (2012, 2013, 2018, 2019). He also won the gold medal at the 2013 Summer Universiade. Furthermore, he was runner-up at the 2013 World Championships and the 2014 and 2015 World Cup. Vlasov trains under Viktor Kuznetsov, the same coach who raised Aleksandr Karelin.

In 2020, he won the gold medal in the 77 kg event at the 2020 Individual Wrestling World Cup held in Belgrade, Serbia.

References

External links

 
 wrestrus.ru
 Instagram Roman Vlasov

1990 births
Living people
Sportspeople from Novosibirsk
Russian male sport wrestlers
Olympic wrestlers of Russia
Wrestlers at the 2012 Summer Olympics
Wrestlers at the 2016 Summer Olympics
Olympic gold medalists for Russia
Olympic medalists in wrestling
Medalists at the 2012 Summer Olympics
Medalists at the 2016 Summer Olympics
World Wrestling Championships medalists
Universiade medalists in wrestling
Universiade gold medalists for Russia
European Wrestling Championships medalists
Medalists at the 2013 Summer Universiade
21st-century Russian people